The 2005 All-Ireland Senior Hurling Championship Final was a hurling match that took place on Sunday, 11 September 2005. The match was played at Croke Park in Dublin, Ireland, to determine the winner of the 2005 All-Ireland Senior Hurling Championship. The final was contested by Cork and Galway, with Cork winning on a score line of 1–21 to 1–16. It was their second consecutive All-Ireland title.

This was the 29th championship meeting between Cork and Galway in over one hundred years of competitive games. Cork had won the previous twenty-four encounters while Galway had only put Cork to the sword four times. Furthermore, Cork had a 100% record over Galway in All-Ireland finals.  Their last meeting at this stage of the championship was in 1990, when Cork staged a great comeback to take the title. Galway's four victories over Cork, on the other hand, came in games when Cork were expected to win easily. The All-Ireland semi-finals of 1975, 1979 and 1985 saw Galway catch Cork on the hop, while their most recent victory over 'the Rebels' came in an All-Ireland qualifier in 2002.
The game was shown live in Ireland on RTÉ2 as part of The Sunday Game live with match commentary provided by Ger Canning and analysis by Michael Duignan.

Match summary

First half
Cork, as reigning All-Ireland champions, began the game in confident mood.  Their defence stood up to the Galway attack with Ronan Curran producing his best game of the year.

It was 0–4 to 0–1 after just ten minutes, during which time Brian Corcoran looked threatening in full-forward line. All of the Cork players settled much better than their Galway counterparts, with Timmy McCarthy, Tom Kenny and Jerry O'Connor all winning the most of the possession in the centre of the field.

Cork were almost totally in control by the half-way stage of the opening thirty-five minutes.  It wasn't a surprise, then, to see them produce a goal in the sixteenth minute, coming from Ben O'Connor's clinical finishing. Cork were now six points in front and there were still no signs of Galway repeating their semi-final performance and springing an ambush.

Derek Hardiman and Alan Kerins launched the Galway attack.  The latter scored three points against John Gardiner, resulting in the Cork number five being moved to the opposite wing.  Kerins might have had a goal immediately after O’Connor's strike, only for Donal Óg Cusack bringing off a terrific save.

Niall Healy was unable to trouble full-back Diarmuid O'Sullivan, while Damien Hayes didn't get enough ball to trouble corner-back Pat Mulcahy.

There was no appreciable change in the direction of the game until about 15 minutes from half time, by which time Galway had begun to make real progress. It started with a tightening of the defence, which saw former captain Ollie Canning excel in the left corner, Tony Óg Regan starting to come to terms with the threat from Corcoran and David Collins coming into his own at left-half.

Cork gave away frees which presented Ger Farragher with two scores and saw the two midfielders each put over a score.

For the first time, Cork were beginning to struggle as a result of their lack of penetration in the half-forward line, the inability of Joe Deane to make any headway against Damien Joyce and Corcoran's struggle to make space for himself at full-forward.

Inaccuracy was another factor which lessened their influence and Galway finished the half trailing by only two points – 1–9 to 0–10.

Second half
On the restart Cork quickly recovered their form with three points in a seven-minute period. It meant that Cork's ability to pick off scores more easily than Galway gave them the confidence to hurl comfortably within themselves, without being put under serious pressure.

That self-belief also came through after Hayes put the ball in the net following another excellent save by Cusack, from Richie Murray. The margin was now down to just a single point.

The game was now at its most critical stage, when Galway were either going to continue their revival or the champions were going to draw on their reserves of confidence and craft. Essentially, the latter happened. Once again, they came out on top in defence – John Gardiner's move to left wing-back benefiting him, while captrain Seán Óg Ó hAilpín was inspirational in everything he did.

Galway contributed to their own downfall through poor shooting and a disappointing response from Murray and David Forde in the half-forward line.

The advantage from the back gradually moved forward, eliciting excellent play once more from Kenny and Jerry O’Connor, who put valuable scores on the board.

Cork scored six points to Galway's two over the last 10 minutes. With Ronan Curran finishing as strongly as he started the game and Ben O’Connor picking off some great scores, Cork eased their way to victory – 1–21 to 1–16.

Match details

MATCH RULES
70 minutes.
Replay if scores level.
Maximum of five substitutions.

External links
2005 All-Ireland Senior Hurling Championship Final at Hurling Stats
Match Video

All-Ireland Senior Hurling Championship Final
All-Ireland Senior Hurling Championship Final, 2005
All-Ireland Senior Hurling Championship Final
All-Ireland Senior Hurling Championship Finals
Cork county hurling team matches
Galway GAA matches